Pyromania is a mental disorder characterized by a compulsion to set fires.

Pyromania or Pyromaniac may also refer to:
 Pyromania (album), a 1983 album by Def Leppard
 "Pyromania" (song), a 2010 song by Cascada
 Pyromaniac (film), a 2016 Norwegian film
 The Pyromaniac, a thought experiment in epistemology

See also 
 Arson
 Firestarter (disambiguation)
 Start a Fire (disambiguation)
 Start the Fire (disambiguation)